Pompeiu Hărășteanu (14 September 1935, Luduș – 5 October 2016, Bucharest) was a Romanian operatic bass/basso profondo.

Hărășteanu was a graduate of the Ciprian Porumbescu Conservatory, Bucharest. He sang as a soloist for the Opera Bonn, Germany, between 1968 and 1972. He sang as a soloist of the National Opera in Bucharest since 1972. He was known for his low powerful voice and for opera roles such Osmin in Mozart's Die Entführung aus dem Serail and Sarastro in Die Zauberflöte.

References

1935 births
2016 deaths
20th-century Romanian male opera singers
Operatic basses